Alberto Fernández Fernández (born 19 November 1943) is a former Spanish footballer.

Career
He played for Atlético de Madrid between 1969 and 1979, winning the Spanish League in 1970, 1973, and 1977, the Intercontinental Cup in 1974, and the Spanish Cup in 1972 and 1976. Fernández played in the 1974 European Cup Final, which Atlético lost.

Honours
 Atlético Madrid
Intercontinental Cup: 1974
Copa del Generalísimo: 1971-72,1975-76
Spanish League: 1969-70, 1972-73, 1976-77

References

1943 births
Living people
Atlético Madrid footballers
Sporting de Gijón players
Real Valladolid players
Footballers from Asturias
Spanish footballers
Association football midfielders